Anthony Hunt (1932–2022) was a British engineer. Other notable people of that name include:

 Anthony Hunt (Royal Navy officer, died 1795) (died 1795), Royal Navy captain
 Anthony Hunt (Royal Navy officer, died 1798) (died 1798), Royal Navy captain

Human names